Edward Haytley was an English portrait and landscape painter of the 18th century. He was born in 1713, but his works are documented  to the period 1740–1764; other biographical detail is equally sparse, but the background of some early professional associates and early sitters suggests he may have come from Lancashire.

Works
Few of his works survive, but he appears to have specialised in the 'conversation piece' form, popular with the landed gentry of mid-18th century England. This form set a group portrait against the backdrop of an idealised representation of the subjects' estates.

His works in this form include: 
 one portrait of Elizabeth Robinson with her parents-in-law, Edward and Elizabeth Montagu, at Sandleford Priory (1744), near Newbury, Berkshire. 
 six portraits of the Stanley family, including one of Sir Robert and Lady Bradshaigh (1746) in front of Haigh Hall
 two portraits of the Brockman family on its Kent estate, Beachborough, both showing the newly constructed Temple Pond. 
One of the latter may include the figure of Susanna Highmore, daughter of the portrait painter Joseph Highmore.

In addition, he accepted commissions for numerous conventional portraits.

Aside from these, his best known works are probably the oil-on-canvas roundels of the Bethlem (1746) and Chelsea (1746) Hospitals, donated to the Foundling Hospital, London. Haytley, like other artists who donated works, was elected a governor of the Hospital.

His last recorded work, dated 1764, was a portrait, depicting Sir William Milner, Bt.

He is assumed to have died around this date.

Images

1744: Elizabeth Montagu and family at Sandleford Priory.
1744: Sarah Scott
1746: Chelsea Hospital roundel Foundling Museum
1746: Bethlem Hospital roundel  Foundling Museum
1746: Sir Robert and Lady Bradshaigh  Museum of Wigan Life, Greater Manchester Museums Group (GMMG)
1752: A Sportsman  Yale Center for British Art
17??: Huntsman with a whippet private collection
17??: Lady Burlington  Chiswick House, English Heritage
17??: Elizabeth Brockman private collection
1750-61: Elizabeth Wandesford (1728-1756) Marble Hill House, English Heritage
1764: Sir William Milner, 2nd Baronet Fitzwilliam Museum

References

Sources
Hugh Belsey, "Haytley, Edward (fl. 1740–1764)", Oxford Dictionary of National Biography, Oxford University Press, 2004 accessed 1 July 2007
National Gallery Victoria, Australia

1713 births
1764 deaths
18th-century English painters
English male painters
18th-century English male artists